Ralph Rosenborg (1913–1992) was an American artist whose paintings were described as both expressionist and abstract and who was a colleague of the New York Abstract Expressionists in the 1940s and 1950s. Unlike them, however, he preferred to make small works and tended to explicitly draw upon natural forms and figures for his abstract subjects.  Called a "highly personal artist," he developed a unique style that was considered to be both mystical and magic. His career was exceptionally long, covering more than 50 years and his output was correspondingly large.

Early life and training

Rosenborg was born in Brooklyn, New York, on June 9, 1913. In 1929, while he was a high school student, he began to work with the designer, artist, and instructor, Henriette Reiss. When Rosenborg encountered her, Reiss was serving as an instructor for the School Art League in the American Museum of Natural History. She was then engaged in instructing both students and their teachers in the city school system by a method she called Rhythmic Design. She believed  inspiration for abstract designs could be found in rhythms—rhythms that could be perceived in ordinary perceptions much as they are when listening to music. She said the rhythms of a musical composition might inspire a graphic pattern of forms and colors and in the same way rhythms perceived in a sunset or the ripples of a stream might be translated into a graphic design: anything seen, heard, or read might furnish an idea for a symbolic interpretation. She believed that rhythm is present everywhere and that students could be trained to sense its various manifestations. In May 1930 Reiss selected a drawing by Rosenborg to be shown in an exhibition of creative design by City high school students. From 1930 to 1933, aged 17 to 20, Rosenborg studied with Reiss in what Vivian Raynor of the New York Times called a "pupil-apprentice" relationship. During this time she instructed him in music appreciation, literature, and art history as well as giving technical training in art.

Career in art

In April 1934 Rosenborg was one of 1,500 artists to participate in the annual Salons of America exhibition, which was held that year in Rockefeller Center's RCA Building. Each paid two dollars for the privilege of hanging up to three works and none was given prominence over the others. The New York Times reported that by the time the show closed a month later, some 30,000 people had viewed it. The following year he was given a solo exhibition (his first) at the Lounge Gallery of the Eighth Street Playhouse. The year after that he participated in a group show held by the Municipal Art Committee and in 1937 was given a second solo exhibition, this time in the Artists Gallery, which, like the Lounge Gallery, specialized in shows of deserving young artists who were unable to show in New York's commercial galleries. That year he also became a founding member of and participated in a group show held by American Abstract Artists, a loose assembly of artists that aimed to promote abstract art and artists in New York. At roughly the same time Rosenborg associated himself with a group of abstractionists that called itself "The Ten" and in May 1938 joined with its other members in what would be his first appearance in a commercial gallery: the Gallery Georgette Passedoit. In 1938 he his work appeared in a group show at the Lounge Gallery, in 1939 in group shows at the Artists Gallery and (with other members of The Ten) at the Bonestell Gallery, and in 1940 yet another group show (with other members of American Abstract Artists) at the American Fine Arts Building.

During this period Rosenborg began an association with an art dealer, Marian Guthrie Willard, that would last into the war years. Willard was known for selecting artists whose work she admired without regard to their commercial potential. She aimed to nurture the careers of young artists whose work, as she put it, made "a personal statement as well as a vision of the universal." In 1938 Rosenborg's paintings were included in group shows at her East River Gallery, in 1939 at a gallery she ran jointly with J.B Neumann called the Neumann-Willard Gallery, in 1942 at the Willard Gallery, and in 1943 at the same place. Willard gave Rosenborg solo shows in February and November 1941.

Rosenborg never had an exclusive long-term relationship with a commercial gallery. Throughout his career his work appeared in both group and solo shows in a wide variety of galleries and museums both in New York and elsewhere in the United States. Examples include the Phillips Memorial Gallery (group, 1941), Yale University Art Gallery (group, 1942), Brandt (group, 1944), the Pinacotheca (solo, 1945), Troeger-Phillips (solo, 1946), Chinese Gallery (solos, 1946 and 1947), Art Institute of Chicago (group, 1948), Corcoran Gallery of Art (groups, 1949 and 1959) Seligmann (solo, 1950), Davis (solos, 1953 and 1954), Delacorte (solo, 1955), and Landry (solo, 1959, 1960, and 1962). He contributed paintings to exhibitions at the Whitney Museum of American Art in 1946, 1953, 1956, 1957, 1976, and 1990. He was given retrospective exhibitions in 1982 at the Schlesinger-Boisanté Gallery and in 1983 at the Princeton Gallery of Fine Art.

Artistic style and critical reception

Unlike better-known abstract expressionists, Rosenborg made small paintings and gave preference to gouaches and watercolors over oils. From his mentor, Henriette Reiss, he had learned a style of abstraction that involved symbolic interpretation of natural rhythms. Critics noted a preference for a gestural abstraction rather than a geometrical one. They also saw a persistent use of symbols, noting a similarity to the work of Wassily Kandinsky and Paul Klee. Throughout his career critics further saw a distinct lyricism in Rosenborg's work. Rosenborg's 1937 watercolor, "Abstracts in Blues and Greens" (at left above) illustrates his early watercolor style. "The Far-away City" of 1941 (at right above) illustrates his early style in oils. "American Landscape" (at left above) illustrates his late style in oils. "Landscape with Pink, Green, and Blue" (at right above) illustrates his late watercolor style.

His early work obscured the natural forms that inspired them making critics see them as tending toward pure abstraction. In the early 1950s he made a transition to a more clearly figurative expression. These late works were said to give off an air of mystery. Writing of a solo show held at the Landry Gallery in October 1960, Stuart Preston of the New York Times said, "The essence of mystery and magic is exactly what distinguishes Ralph Rosenborg's meditative semi-abstract landscape water-colors... These are rapturous little acts of visual and manual concentration at first sight inscrutable and then revealing themselves to be precise and allusive. Writing about the same show, Bennett Schiff, critic for the New York Post, said "A mystical intensity and a beauty which burns in ruby and sapphire colors are in these fine paintings."

Personal life and family

Rosenborg's birth name was Ralph Mozart Rosenborg. He was born on June 9, 1913, to Mozart Wolfgang Rosenborg (October 28, 1884 to March 4, 1932) and his wife Helen Rosenborg (September 20, 1888 to September 28, 1947).  Both parents were born in Sweden. Rosenborg's father emigrated to New York in 1903 and lived in New York City. During Rosenborg's childhood, he was a machinist. Later he earned his living as a stockroom man. His mother was sometimes a homemaker and sometimes earned a living as a cook. As a child he had hoped to play the violin, but private lessons were beyond his family's means. The art programs of the city's public schools and the privately funded Art School League gave him the opportunity for no-cost art training and brought him into contact with Henriette Reiss who became his mentor and supporter.

It is likely that sales of paintings never brought in enough money for Rosenborg to live on. Between 1936 and 1938 he taught classes at the Brooklyn Institute of Arts and Sciences and subsequently served as a guard for a year or two at the Museum of Non-Objective Painting. Throughout his career he was thought to have relied on the women in his life for economic as well as emotional support—first his mother, then Louise Nevelson, with whom he had a passionate relationship between 1942 and 1948, then, briefly, her sister, Anita, and finally, his wife, Margaret, after they met in 1949 and married in 1951.

Suffering from alcoholism and burdened with an erratic and often combative personality, he was said not to have a single close friend. According to Nevelson's biographer, "Rosenborg's gifts as a painter were undermined by his alcoholism, irascible temper, and adolescent-like quest for independence..." Another writer said he had an "exasperating character" and was "a legend in the art world for his suspicion of anything smacking of entanglement in social or professional relationships."

After he was afflicted with a stroke in 1991, Rosenborg and his wife moved to her home town of Portland, Oregon, and there he died in a nursing home on October 22, 1992.

Notes

References

1913 births
1992 deaths
Abstract painters
20th-century American painters
Artists from Brooklyn
Abstract expressionist artists
Federal Art Project artists